Bellengreville is the name of several communes in France:

 Bellengreville, Calvados 
 Bellengreville, Seine-Maritime